Ernest Price may refer to:

 Ernest B. Price (1890–1973), American diplomat, university professor, military officer and businessman
 Jack Dillon (Ernest Cutler Price, 1891–1942), world light heavyweight boxing champion
 Ernest Griffith Price (1870–1962), British politician
 Ernie Price (born 1950), American football player
 Ernie Price (English footballer) (1926–2013), English footballer and football manager
 Ernest V. Price, American architect
 Ernest W Price, British surgeon, discovered the etiology of podoconiosis

See also
 Price (surname)